The ITT International Fellowship Program was a program of grants promoting international educational student exchanges, similar to the Fulbright Program, sponsored by the International Telephone & Telegraph Corporation. The program was administered by the Institute of International Education from 1973 until the mid-1980s.

History 
Between 1973 and 1982, 498 students received ITT fellowships: 244 American students who went abroad for a year of study, and 254 non-US students who came to the US, usually to pursue a master's degree. Graduate students were also awarded this fellowship from 1983-1986. During this time, the fellowship was administered in conjunction with the Fulbright Program. It was considered especially prestigious at the time, because it provided students with more funding than the Fulbright Program.

Notable alumni
 Madeleine Mitchell, violinist
 Richard Francis-Jones, Australian architect
 David France, author and football historian
 Deborah Scroggins, author and journalist
 Charles H. Grice, Finance expert
 Susan Tintori, Founding Executive Director The Florence Academy of Art
 Martin S. Flaherty, Director The Leitner Center for International Law and Justice

References 
The ITT International Fellowship Program: An Assessment After Ten Years, by Marianthi Zikopoulos, Inst of Intl Education, 

Student exchange
Scholarships in the United States